Zambesa is a genus of flies in the family Tachinidae.

Species
 Zambesa claripalpis Villeneuve, 1926

References

Tachinidae genera
Taxa named by Francis Walker (entomologist)